Żabia Wola  is a village in Grodzisk Mazowiecki County, Masovian Voivodeship, in east-central Poland. It is the seat of the gmina (administrative district) called Gmina Żabia Wola.

The village has a population of 530.

References

Villages in Grodzisk Mazowiecki County